The America Creating Opportunities to Meaningfully Promote Excellence in Technology, Education, and Science Act of 2007, or America COMPETES Act, was authored by Bart Gordon, and became law on August 9, 2007, when it was signed by President George W. Bush. This was an act "[t]o invest in innovation through research and development, and to improve the competitiveness of the United States".

On May 29, 2010, the U.S. House passed a measure to reauthorize the America COMPETES Act. On July 22, 2010, the U.S. Senate Committee on Commerce, Science, and Transportation approved America COMPETES Reauthorization Act of 2010 and sent it to the Senate for a vote. On January 4, 2011, President Barack Obama signed into law the America COMPETES Reauthorization Act of 2010. On February 4, 2022, the House passed the America COMPETES Act of 2022. On March 28, 2022, the Senate passed the America COMPETES Act of 2022.

America COMPETES Act of 2007

The provisions of The America COMPETES Act of 2007 covered a wide range of activities of a great number of federal agencies and offices including the Office of Science and Technology Policy (Title I), the National Aeronautics and Space Administration (Title II), the National Institute of Standards and Technology (Title III), the National Oceanic and Atmospheric Administration (NOAA, Title IV), the Department of Energy (Title V), and the National Science Foundation (Title VII). In many places, the Act mandates that each agency cooperates with its partner agencies and offices, and it calls attention to the importance of high-risk, high-reward research in areas of critical national need.

General provisions
The America COMPETES Act of 2007 has many provisions in its 146 pages.

It created the President's Council on Innovation and Competitiveness (Title I, Sec. 1006). This council appears never to have actually been formed. Instead, the President's Council of Advisors on Science and Technology (PCAST) was formed in 2010 by President Obama to serve in its place. This committee is also known as the President's Innovation and Technology Advisory Committee.

It called for a National Science and Technology Summit (Title I, Sec. 1001) and numerous reports on the state of innovation and competitiveness in the United States (e.g., Sec. 1002, 1005, 1006, 1007, 2006, 3004, 3005, 3011, 7007, 7010, 7014, 7016, 7032) and assessments of each unit's effective support of the Act's science, technology, engineering, and mathematics (STEM) education agenda (e.g., Sec. 2001.f, 3011)

In several places, it called for the enhancement of research capabilities and coordination (e.g., Sec. 2003, 5006, 5011) and emphasized the importance of undergraduate research experiences as tools that promote careers in STEM fields (e.g., Sec. 2005, 7025).

The Act also sets baselines for targeted funding appropriations (e.g., Sec 3001,  5004.f, 5005, 5007, 5008, 5009, 5012, 6115, 6116, 6304, 6502, 7002) which range from overall levels of funding for an agency or targeting funding for new programs to be delivered by a given agency. Of special note is the Act's goal of doubling the annual appropriations for the National Science Foundation by the year 2011.

Education Provisions

The Act pays considerable attention to the efforts each agency makes in the area of educating future STEM wage workers, sometimes through amendments made to other Acts (e.g., Sec 5003.a, 3015, 4002, 5004), a general technique which is used in several places in the Act. In addition, the Act devotes considerable space to education and places it at the same level of prominence in the Act as the Federal agencies mentioned above (i.e., Title VI). Title VI, Subtitle A of the Act is titled "Teacher Assistance" and is divided into parts, each of which addresses separate provisions:

  "Part I: Teachers for a Competitive Tomorrow." Will develop and implement programs that will increase the production of professionals with both a baccalaureate degree in STEM and critical foreign languages and teaching certification (e.g., programs modeled off of the University of Texas, Austin's UTeach program); will develop 2-3 year part-time masters programs in teaching for such professionals to enhance their content knowledge and pedagogical skills; and will develop professional science master's degree programs.
 "Part II: Advanced Placement and International Baccalaureate Programs." Will raise the achievement of secondary students through AP and IB programs by increasing by 700,000 (by 2008) the number of teachers qualified to teach AP and IB in STEM and critical foreign languages; will increase by 700,000 the number of students from high-need schools who either (1) score higher than a 2 on STEM or critical foreign language AP exams as administered by the College Board, or (2) earn a passing score on an analogous IB exam; will increase the availability of and enrollment in AP and IB courses and pre-AB and pre-IB courses in high-need schools.
 "Part III:  Promising Practices in STEM Teaching." Established a panel of experts to provide information on promising practices for strengthening teaching and learning in science, technology, engineering, and mathematics at the elementary school and secondary school levels.

Title Vi, Subtitle B of the Act is titled Mathematics. Its purpose is to enable all elementary and middle school students to reach or exceed grade-level academic achievement standards and to prepare the students to enroll in and pass algebra; to provide summer term programs in mathematics, technology, and problem-solving; and to provide targeted support for low-income and special needs middle school students and their teachers. Subtitle C of the Act is titled Foreign Language Partnership Program". It will increase the opportunities to study critical foreign languages and the context in which the critical foreign languages are spoken, and increase the number of American students who achieve the highest level of proficiency in critical foreign languages. Subtitle D of the Act is called Alignment of Education Programs, and it aims to coordinate learning outcomes and assessments across State and Federal stakeholders. Subtitle D of the Act called Mathematics and Science Partnership Bonus Grants'', sets out modest (e.g., $50,000) awards to high-need schools in each state which show the greatest improvement on the State's assessment in mathematics, and another for the greatest improvement on the State's assessment in science.

Provisions for the National Science Foundation
Title VII addresses the National Science Foundation directly. The National Science Foundation is the only American Federal agency whose mission includes support for all fields of fundamental science and engineering, except for medical sciences, so it reasonable for both the America COMPETES Act of 2007 and this article to single out the agency.

In Sec. 6002, the Act makes specific provisions on the appropriation for the following NSF programs in FY2008 through FY2010: the Major Research Instrumentation program, the Faculty Early Career Development (CAREER) Program, the Research Experiences for Undergraduates program, the Experimental Program to Stimulate Competitive Research, the Integrative Graduate Education and Research Traineeship program, the Graduate Research Fellowship program, a new the professional science master's degree program, for Mathematics and Science Education Partnerships, the Robert Noyce Scholarship Program, the Science, Mathematics, Engineering, and Technology Talent Expansion Program, and the Advanced Technological Education program. The NSF's FY2008 appropriation is set at $6.6 billion by this Act, and the appropriation grows to $8.132 billion in FY2010.

The Act mandates new proposal requirements such as a mentoring plan for all postdoctoral positions (Sec. 7008), that each institution receiving NSF funds for STEM research or education have the plan to provide training on the responsible conduct of research to undergraduates, graduate students, and postdoctoral researchers (Sec. 7009), and the sharing of final project reports (Sec. 7010, 7011).

It also appears that research directorates are being directed to share some of the cost of the educational work of the NSF (e.g., Section 7025).

The Act mandates that the NSF commission a report from the National Academies of Sciences about barriers to increasing the number of underrepresented minorities in STEM fields and to identify strategies for bringing more underrepresented minorities into the STEM workforce (Sec. 7032).

America COMPETES Act of 2010

The House reauthorized the Act on May 28, 2010, by a vote of 262–150.  On December 17, 2010, the Senate passed an amended version of H.R. 5116 by unanimous consent.  Then, on December 22, the House voted 228-130 to pass the Senate's version and allow it to become law.

America COMPETES Act of 2007 rejuvenated focus on increasing basic research investment in the physical sciences, strengthening educational opportunities in the science, technology, engineering, and mathematics fields, and developing a robust innovation infrastructure. Reauthorization of America COMPETES Act continues a robust investment in basic research and education and preserves the essence of the original Act by increasing the investment focus on science, technology, engineering, and mathematics basic research education as a national priority.

The Economic and Statistics Administration, in the Department of Commerce, created the https://web.archive.org/web/20111222171817/http://www.commerce.gov/Competes web site with the text of the Act, information on the innovative and competitive capacity of the U.S. and video recordings of top Commerce officials.

Provisions of Act

The COMPETES Act provides increased funding, expands the authorization of committees involved in STEM and business fields, and establishes an undersecretary position. There are specifically two authorization acts one for the National Institute of Standards and Technology and the other for the National Science Foundation. The Act lays out several studies to be completed and established a new office in the Department of Commerce. The Act affected mainly the Department of Commerce, Department of Energy, National Science Foundation, and the White House.

Office of Science and Technology Policy
The Act requires the White House's Office of Science and Technology Policy to establish a committee to coordinate federal programs and activities in support of STEM education. The committee was to include representatives of the National Science Foundation, Department of Energy, NASA, NOAA, Department of Education, OMB and other agencies. The committee is to encourage the teaching of innovation and entrepreneurship as part of STEM education activities; develop, implement, and update every five years a five-year STEM education strategic plan which shall specify and prioritize annual and long-term objectives; and establish, periodically update, and maintain an inventory of federally sponsored STEM education programs and activities, including documentation of assessments of the effectiveness of such programs and activities and rates of participation by women, underrepresented minorities, and persons in rural areas.[1] The director of OSTP reports annual progress and the 5-year plan to Congress at the time of the President’s Budget Request.

Sec 102 of Title I established the Committee on Technology under the National Science and Technology Council to coordinate federal agencies with advanced manufacturing research and development progress and to set goals and priorities for strengthening American manufacturing.

National Aeronautics and Space Administration
Under Title II NASA must carry out education programs that are designed to increase student interest and participation in STEM, improve literacy in STEM, and provide curriculum support and materials. NASA must also conduct an assessment of the impediments to the space science workforce for minority and underrepresented groups. The report must be transmitted to the House of Representatives Committee on Science and Technology and the Senate Committee on Commerce, Science, and Transportation not later than 15 months after the date of enactment of this Act.

National Oceanic and Atmospheric Administration

Research and development
NOAA is to identify emerging and innovative research and development priorities to enhance the United States competitiveness, and support the development of new economic opportunities based on NOAA research, observations, monitoring modeling, and predictions that sustain ecosystem services. NOAA must also promote United States leadership in oceanic and atmospheric science and competitiveness in the applied uses of such knowledge, including for the development and expansion of economic opportunities; and finally, advance ocean, coastal, Great Lakes, and atmospheric research and development, including potentially transformational research, in collaboration with other relevant Federal agencies, academic institutions, the private sector, and nongovernmental programs, consistent with NOAA's mission to understand, observe, and model the Earth's atmosphere and biosphere, including the oceans, in an integrated manner.

Education
NOAA must also continue to carry out and support research-based programs and activities designed to increase student interest and participation in STEM; improve public literacy in STEM; employ proven strategies and methods for improving student learning and teaching in STEM and provide curriculum support materials.

National Institute of Standards and Technology
Referred to as the National Institute of Standards and Technology Authorization Act of 2010, it authorizes an appropriation of $918,900,000 to NIST for the fiscal year 2011.
 $584,500,000 authorized for scientific and technical research and services laboratory activities;
 $124,800,000 authorized for the construction and maintenance of facilities;
 $209,600,000 authorized for industrial Technology services activities, of which $141,100,000 authorized for the Manufacturing Extension Partnership program and
 $10,000,000 authorized for the Malcolm Baldrige National Quality Award

For the fiscal year 2012, there are authorized to be appropriated to the Secretary of Commerce $970,800,000 for the National Institute of Standards and Technology for the fiscal year 2012.
 $661,100,000 authorized for scientific and technical research and services laboratory activities;
 $84,900,000 authorized for the construction and maintenance of facilities;
 $224,800,000 authorized for industrial technology services activities, of which $155,100,000 shall be authorized for the Manufacturing Extension Partnership program and
 $10,300,000 authorized for the Malcolm Baldrige National Quality Award program.

For the fiscal year 2013, there is authorization to be appropriated to the Secretary of Commerce $1,039,709,000 for the National Institute of Standards and Technology.
 $676,700,000 authorized for scientific and technical research and services laboratory activities;
 $121,300,000 authorized for the construction and maintenance of facilities;
  $241,709,000 authorized for industrial technology services activities, of which $165,100,000 shall be authorized for the Manufacturing Extension Partnership program and
 $10,609,000 shall be authorized for the Malcolm Baldrige National Quality Award program.

Under Secretary of Commerce for Standards and Technology
Section 403 of Title IV established the Under Secretary of Commerce for Standards and Technology. The position will be appointed by the President with the advice and consent of the Senate.

Section 405 established a research initiative to support the development of emergency communication and tracking technologies for use in locating trapped individuals in confined spaces, such as underground mines, and other shielded environments, such as high-rise buildings or collapsed structures, where conventional radio communication is limited.

Section 408 states the Director will carry out a green manufacturing and construction initiative to develop accurate sustainability metrics and practices for use in manufacturing; advance the development of standards, including high-performance green building standards, and the creation of an information infrastructure to communicate sustainability information about suppliers; and move buildings toward becoming high-performance green buildings, including improving energy performance, service life, and indoor air quality of new and retrofitted buildings through validated measurement data.

National Science Foundation
For the fiscal year 2011, there is authorization to be appropriated to the Foundation $7,424,400,000.
 $5,974,782,000 made available to carry out research and related activities;
 $937,850,000  made available for education and human resources;
 $164,744,000 made available for major research equipment and facilities construction;
 $327,503,000 made available for agency operations and award management;
 $4,803,000 made available for the Office of the National Science Board;
 $14,718,000 made available for the Office of Inspector General.

For the fiscal year 2012, there is authorization to be appropriated to the Foundation $7,800,000,000.
 $6,234,281,000 made available to carry out research and related activities;
 $978,959,000 made available for education and human resources;
 $225,544,000 made available for major research equipment and facilities construction;
 $341,676,000 made available for agency operations and award management;
 $4,808,000 made available for the Office of the National Science Board;
 $14,732,000 made available for the Office of Inspector General.

For the fiscal year 2013, there is authorization to be appropriated to the Foundation $8,300,000,000.
 $6,637,849,000 made available to carry out research and related activities;
 $1,041,762,000 made available for education and human resources;
 $236,764,000 made available for major research equipment and facilities construction;
 $363,670,000 made available for agency operations and award management;
 $4,906,000 made available for the Office of the National Science Board;
 $15,049,000 made available for the Office of Inspector General.

Merit-based grants and fellowships
Several merit-based partnerships between the federal government and higher education institutions or businesses are extended or created under COMPETES. For manufacturing institutions of higher education to support fundamental research leading to transformative advances in manufacturing technologies, processes, and enterprises that will support United States manufacturing through improved performance, productivity, sustainability, and competitiveness. Research areas may include nanomanufacturing; manufacturing and construction machines and equipment, including robotics, automation, and other intelligent systems; manufacturing enterprise systems; advanced sensing and control techniques; materials processing; and information technologies for manufacturing, including predictive and real-time models and simulations, and virtual manufacturing.

Manufacturing education
In order to help ensure a well-trained manufacturing workforce, the director will award grants to strengthen and expand scientific and technical education and training in advanced manufacturing, including through the Foundation's Advanced Technological Education program.

Merit-based grants and funding were made available to higher education institutions that promote innovation and increase the impact of research by developing tools and resources to connect new scientific discoveries to practical uses.
Also, merit-based grants are made available to support research into green and sustainable chemistry which will lead to clean, safe, and economical alternatives to traditional chemical products and practices.

Title V also continues the support of the Louis Stokes Alliance for Minority Participation Program, which permits specialized STEM high schools conducting research to participate in major data collection initiatives from universities, corporations, or government labs under a research grant from the Foundation, as part of the research proposal. It also provides merit-based grants for institutions providing STEM education research and internship opportunities for undergraduates.

The director shall, in consultation with appropriate federal agencies, identify ways to use cyber-enabled learning to create H. R. 5116—32 an innovative STEM workforce and to help retrain and retain our existing STEM workforce to address national challenges, including national security and competitiveness, and use technology to enhance or supplement laboratory-based learning. Title V also extends the Experimental Program to Stimulate Competitive Research and STEM Talent Expansion Program

The director shall continue to support a program to award grants on a competitive, merit-reviewed basis to tribal colleges and universities (as defined in section 316 of the Higher Education Act of 1965 (20 U.S.C. 1059c), including institutions described in section 317 of such Act (20 U.S.C. 1059d), to enhance the quality of undergraduate STEM education at such institutions and to increase the retention and graduation rates of Native American students pursuing an associate or baccalaureate degrees in STEM.

The director also awards grants, on a competitive, merit-reviewed basis, to institutions of higher education to implement or expand research-based reforms in master's and doctoral level STEM education that emphasize preparation for diverse careers utilizing STEM degrees, including at diverse types of institutions of higher education, in industry, and at government agencies and research laboratories

STEM Training Grant Program
The STEM Training grant program is
 designed to recruit and prepare students who pursue a baccalaureate degree in science, technology, engineering, or mathematics to become certified as elementary and secondary teachers;
 requires the education department (or its equivalent) and the departments or division responsible for the preparation of science, technology, engineering, and mathematics majors at an institution of higher education to collaborate in establishing and implementing the program at that institution;
 requires students participating in the program to enter the program through a field-based course and to continue to complete field-based courses supervised by master teachers throughout the program;
 hire sufficient teachers so that the ratio of students to master teachers in the program does not exceed 100 to 1;
 includes instruction in the use of scientifically based instructional materials and methods, assessments, pedagogical content knowledge (including the interaction between mathematics and science), the use of instructional technology, and how to incorporate State and local standards into the classroom curriculum;
 restricts to students participating in the program those courses that are specifically designed for the needs of teachers of science, technology, engineering, and mathematics; and
 requires students participating in the program to successfully complete a final evaluation of their teaching proficiency, based on their classroom teaching performance, conducted by multiple trained observers, and a portfolio of their accomplishments.

The program award grants annually on a competitive basis to institutions of higher education in the amount of $2,000,000 per institution, of which $1,500,000 shall be used—
 to design, implement, and evaluate a program that meets the requirements of section 552;
 to employ master teachers at the institution to oversee field experiences;
 to provide a stipend to mentor teachers participating in the program; and
 to support curriculum development and implementation strategies for science, technology, H. R. 5116—42 engineering, and mathematics content courses taught through the program;
and up to $500,000 shall be set aside by the grantee for technical support and evaluation services from the institution whose programs will be replicated.

Innovation

Office of Innovation and Entrepreneurship
Through the COMPETES Act, the Secretary of Commerce established an Office of Innovation and Entrepreneurship to foster innovation and the commercialization of new technologies, products, processes, and services to promote productivity and economic growth in the United States. The Office of Innovation and Entrepreneurship is responsible for developing policies to accelerate innovation and advance the commercialization of research and development, including federally funded research and development, identifying existing barriers to innovation and commercialization, including access to capital and other resources, and ways to overcome those barriers, particularly in States participating in the Experimental Program to Stimulate Competitive Research, providing access to relevant data, research, and technical assistance on innovation and commercialization; strengthening collaboration on and coordination of policies relating to innovation and commercialization, including those focused on the needs of small businesses and rural communities, within the Department of Commerce, between the Department of Commerce and other Federal agencies, and between the Department of Commerce and appropriate State government agencies and institutions, as appropriate; and any other duties as determined by the Secretary.

Federal Loan Guarantees for Innovative Technologies in Manufacturing
The Secretary shall establish a program to provide loan guarantees for obligations to small- or medium-sized manufacturers for the use or production of innovative technologies. A loan guarantee may be made under the program only for a project that re-equips, expands, or establishes a manufacturing facility in the United States to
 use an innovative technology or an innovative process in manufacturing;
 manufacture an innovative technology product or an integral component of such a product; or
 commercialize an innovative product, process, or idea that was developed by research funded in whole or in part by a grant from the Federal government.

A loan guarantee may be made under the program only for a borrower who is a small- or medium-sized manufacturer.
A loan guarantee will not exceed an amount equal to 80 percent of the obligation, as estimated at the time at which the loan guarantee is issued. No loan guarantee shall be made unless the Secretary determines that there is a reasonable prospect of repayment of the principal and interest on the obligation by the borrower; the amount of the obligation (when combined with amounts available to the borrower from other sources) is sufficient to carry out the project; the obligation is not subordinate to other financings; the obligation bears interest at a rate that does not exceed a level that the Secretary determines appropriate, taking into account the prevailing rate of interest in the private sector for similar loans and risks; and the term of an obligation requires full repayment over a period not to exceed the lesser of 30 years; or  90 percent of the projected useful life, as determined by the Secretary, of the physical asset to be financed by the obligation.

Regional Innovation Program
Under COMPETES the federal government encourages and supports the development of regional innovation strategies, including regional innovation clusters and science and research parks.

Grants awarded under this subsection may be used for activities determined appropriate by the Secretary, including the following:
Feasibility studies
Planning activities
Technical assistance
 Developing or strengthening communication and collaboration between and among participants of a regional innovation cluster.
Attracting additional participants to a regional innovation cluster
Facilitating market development of products and services developed by a regional innovation cluster, including through demonstration, deployment, technology transfer, and commercialization activities
Developing relationships between a regional innovation cluster and entities or clusters in other regions
Interacting with the public and State and local governments to meet the goals of the cluster

The maximum amount of loan principal guaranteed under this subsection may not exceed— ‘‘(A) $50,000,000 with respect to any single project; and ‘‘(B) $300,000,000 with respect to all projects.

Department of Energy
The COMPETES 2010 reauthorization increased funding for science, engineering, and mathematics (STEM) education programs, the Nuclear Science Talent Program, Hydrocarbon Systems Talent Program,  Protecting America's Competitive Edge (PACE) Graduate Student Fellowship, Distinguished Scientist Program, and the Advanced Research Project Agency–Energy (ARPA-E).

United States innovation and competitive capacity
Section 604 of the COMPETES Act required a study on the competitive and innovative capacity of the United States. The Economic and Statistics Administration in the Department of Commerce completed the report. The report includes
An analysis of the United States economy and innovation infrastructure.
An assessment of the following:
 The current competitive and innovation performance of the United States economy relative to other countries that compete economically with the United States.
 Economic competitiveness and domestic innovation in the current business climate, including tax and Federal regulatory policy.
The business climate of the United States and those of other countries that compete economically with the United States.
 Regional issues that influence the economic competitiveness and innovation capacity of the United States, including—
the roles of State and local governments and institutions of higher education; and
regional factors that contribute positively to innovation.
The effectiveness of the Federal Government in supporting and promoting economic competitiveness and innovation, including any duplicative efforts of, or gaps in coverage between, Federal agencies and departments.
 Barriers to competitiveness in newly emerging business or technology sectors, factors influencing underperforming economic sectors, unique issues facing small and medium enterprises, and barriers to the development and evolution of start-ups, firms, and industries.
The effects of domestic and international trade policy on the competitiveness of the United States and the United States economy.
United States export promotion and export finance programs relative to export promotion and export finance programs of other countries that compete economically with the United States, including Canada, France, Germany, Italy, Japan, Korea, and the United Kingdom, with noting of export promotion and export finance programs carried out by such countries that are not analogous to any programs carried out by the United States
The effectiveness of current policies and programs affecting exports, including an assessment of Federal trade restrictions and State and Federal export promotion activities.
The effectiveness of the Federal Government and Federally funded research and development centers in supporting and promoting technology commercialization and technology transfer.
Domestic and international intellectual property policies and practices.
Manufacturing capacity, logistics, and supply chain dynamics of major export sectors, including access to a skilled workforce, physical infrastructure, and broadband network infrastructure.
Federal and State policies relating to science, technology, and education and other relevant Federal and State policies designed to promote commercial innovation, including immigration policies.
Development of recommendations on the following:
How the United States should invest in human capital.
 How the United States should facilitate entrepreneurship and innovation.
How best to develop opportunities for locally and regionally driven innovation by providing Federal support.
How best to strengthen the economic infrastructure and industrial base of the United States. How to improve the international competitiveness of the United States.

COMPETES Report
The report was released on January 6, 2012, by Secretary of Commerce John Bryson. The report outlines the major accomplishments of the American model (pertaining to the aforementioned criteria) in the past and offers brief recommendations for ensuring future success. Here is a summary:

Chapter 1: Rising to the Challenge details the US economy's exceptional past performance, the cause for alarm in employment, wages, innovation indexes, education attainment, and manufacturing, and the interconnectedness between innovation, competitiveness, and the assorted factors contributing to both.

Chapter 2: Keys to Innovation defines the major concepts behind innovation, competitiveness and government intervention. Chapter 2 also goes into more depth into what made the United States successful in the past. Detailed sections on how the United States created a competitive edge through widespread education, large-scale funding of public works projects, research and development and successful public –private partnerships.

Chapter 3: Federal Support for Research and Development provides justification for increasing federal support for research and development. Research and development is highlighted throughout the report as a key item necessary for increasing the innovative and competitive capacity of the United States.

Chapter 4: Educating our Workforce highlights the positive role STEM education and jobs has in an advanced economy. The STEM workforce is expanding but American students are not gaining STEM skills at the same rate as other developing or industrialized nation. As this trend continues, the competitive edge between the US and other countries diminishes. This chapter also expounds on the role community colleges play in making higher education affordable and a viable option.

Chapter 5: Infrastructure for the 21st Century presents the notion of an information infrastructure. Alongside traditional infrastructure such as the road network, telephone lines, water and sewage this chapter states the American advanced economy must have an information infrastructure – high speed internet access, adequate spectrum allotment, cloud network etc. – that can support the increasingly wireless and technology-based economy.

Chapter 6: Revitalizing Manufacturing explores the importance of the strong manufacturing sector to the US economy. The chapter details the current state of the manufacturing sector and details the recent decline in employment, increase in productivity and the effects outsourcing and other recent conventions have had on output.

Chapter 7: The Private Sector as the Engine of Innovation provides a catalog of recommendations not included in the previous 6 chapters that will help the economy grow. Topics ranging from corporate taxes, intellectual property rights, regional clusters, and increased export initiatives.

The COMPETES report pushes for increased federal support in basic research, the redoing of the American education system and the reallocation of wireless spectrum. It also details the importance of the manufacturing sector to the American economy and how improvements in research and development, education and information infrastructure can lead to employment and a greater competitive edge.

Innovation Advisory Board
The innovation advisory board was a fifteen-member group of business and nonprofit leaders in the fields of science, technology and innovation: Robert Atkinson, Rebecca Bagley, Jim Clements, Abby Joseph Cohen, Larry Cohen, Judy Estrin, Rebecca Henderson, Irwin Jacobs, Arthur Levinson, James Manyika, Natalia Olson-Urtecho, Kim Polese, Lucy Sanders, Julie Shimer, and Stephen Tang.

America COMPETES Act of 2022 

On January 25, 2022, The House Committee on Science, Space, and Technology, voted to advance H.R 4521 America COMPETES Act of 2022. The bill has bipartisan support and is primarily focused on encouraging and strengthening American scientific and technological innovation and R&D. The bill passed the House on February 4, 2022. The Senate passed an amended bill by substituting the text of H.R. 4521 for the text of the U.S. Innovation and Competition Act on March 28, 2022. The differences between the House and Senate bills were worked out in a congressional conference committee. It became law on August 9, 2022 as the CHIPS and Science Act.

Provisions 
Main provisions include:
 CHIPS for America Fund 
 Provides $76 billion in support of US fabrication of semiconductors
 Authorizes $45 billion to improve America's supply chain
 $2 billion to support critical components in the production of many automobiles, consumer electronics and defense systems

Removed provisions 

 Provision to lift the cap on green cards for people who have been in the queue for more than two years, if they paid a fee.

Lacey Act revisions 
In addition to aspects related to semiconductors, the America COMPETES Act of 2022 contains a rider revising the Lacey Act.   If adopted, this bill would create a whitelist of animal species that would be legal to import into the United States.  Additionally, the bill expands the authority of the US Fish and Wildlife Service, and will limit interstate transit of any species not included in the whitelist.

See also
 Advanced Research Projects Agency—Energy

References

External links
 America COMPETES Act (PDF/details) as amended in the GPO Statute Compilations collection
 America COMPETES Act as enacted in the US Statutes at Large
 H.R.2272 - America COMPETES Act bill information on Congress.gov

Acts of the 111th United States Congress
Acts of the 110th United States Congress
United States federal education legislation
United States federal taxation legislation
2007 in education